Pas vdekjes is a 1980 Albanian black comedy film directed by Kujtim Çashku.

Cast
Kadri Roshi as Adhamudhi
Pavlina Mani as Lulushja
Robert Ndrenika as Zeneli
Prokop Mima as Muzikanti

External links
 

Albanian comedy films
1980 films
1980s black comedy films
1980 comedy-drama films
Albanian-language films
1980 comedy films